The Hanriot HD.18 was a three-seat colonial police aircraft built by Hanriot in the early 1920s.

Specifications (HD.18)

References

Further reading
 
 
 

Hanriot aircraft
Aircraft first flown in 1921